Georgino M'Vondo Ze (born 12 August 1997) is a Central African professional footballer who plays as a forward for Vierzon  and the Central African Republic national team.

Career
M'Vondo has played in the Championnat National 3, first with Saint-Apollinair, then followed by stints at Avallonnais, and Is-Selongey. In January 2020, he signed with Gueugnon.

International career
In May 2021, M'Vondo was called up for the first time to represent the Central African Republic national team. He made his debut in a friendly 2–0 loss to Rwanda on 4 June 2021.

References

External links
 
 FDB Profile

1997 births
Living people
People from Bangui
Central African Republic footballers
Central African Republic international footballers
Association football forwards
FC Gueugnon players
Championnat National 3 players
Central African Republic expatriate footballers
Central African Republic expatriates in France
Expatriate footballers in France